Diego Porfírio da Silva (born 1 August 1999), known as Diego Porfírio or just Diego, is a Brazilian footballer who plays as a left back for Coritiba, on loan from Desportivo Aliança.

Club career
Diego was born in Pindamonhangaba, São Paulo, and was a Taubaté youth graduate. After making his senior debut in the 2018 Copa Paulista, he moved to Democrata-GV for the 2020 season.

In September 2020, Diego was announced at Tupynambás for the Série D. He began the 2021 campaign at Desportivo Aliança, before moving on loan to Série C side Ypiranga-RS on 27 May of that year.

Diego renewed his loan deal for the 2022 season on 8 December 2021, and was a regular starter during the 2022 Campeonato Gaúcho as his side reached the finals for the first time ever. On 4 April 2022, he moved to Série A side Coritiba on loan until April 2023, with a buyout clause.

Diego made his debut in the top tier of Brazilian football on 29 May 2022, coming on as a late substitute for Guilherme Biro in a 1–0 home win over Botafogo.

Career statistics

References

External links
Coritiba profile 

1999 births
Living people
Sportspeople from São Paulo (state)
Brazilian footballers
Association football defenders
Campeonato Brasileiro Série A players
Campeonato Brasileiro Série C players
Campeonato Brasileiro Série D players
Esporte Clube Taubaté players
Esporte Clube Democrata players
Tupynambás Futebol Clube players
Ypiranga Futebol Clube players
Coritiba Foot Ball Club players